Roveredo is a municipality in the Moesa Region in the canton of Graubünden in Switzerland.

Geography
 
Of this area, 8.6% is used for agricultural purposes, while 75% is forested. Of the rest of the land, 3.1% is settled (buildings or roads) and the remainder (13.4%) is non-productive (rivers, glaciers or mountains).

Before 2017, the municipality was located in the Roveredo sub-district of the Moesa district on the right bank of the Moesa river, after 2017 it was in the Moesa Region.

Demographics
, 16.8% of the population was made up of foreign nationals. Over the last 10 years the population has grown at a rate of 6.4%. Most of the population speaks Italian (93.0%), with German being second most common ( 3.2%) and French being third ( 0.7%).  

, the gender distribution of the population was 49.8% male and 50.2% female.  The age distribution, in Roveredo is; 212 children or 10.1% of the population are between 0 and 9 years old.  101 teenagers or 4.8% are 10 to 14, and 88 teenagers or 4.2% are 15 to 19.  Of the adult population, 254 people or 12.0% of the population are between 20 and 29 years old.  352 people or 16.7% are 30 to 39, 291 people or 13.8% are 40 to 49, and 299 people or 14.2% are 50 to 59.  The senior population distribution is 243 people or 11.5% of the population are between 60 and 69 years old, 150 people or 7.1% are 70 to 79, there are 85 people or 4.0% who are 80 to 89, and there are 33 people or 1.6% who are 90 to 99.
In the 2007 federal election the most popular party was the SP which received 32.5% of the vote.  The next three most popular parties were the SVP (27.7%), the CVP (21.7%) and the FDP (17.1%).

In Roveredo about 62.9% of the population (between age 25-64) have completed either non-mandatory upper secondary education or additional higher education (either university or a Fachhochschule).

Roveredo has an unemployment rate of 2.85%.  , there were 43 people employed in the primary economic sector and about 20 businesses involved in this sector.  82 people are employed in the secondary sector and there are 17 businesses in this sector.  371 people are employed in the tertiary sector, with 96 businesses in this sector.

Of the rest of the population,  there are less than 5 individuals who belong to the Christian Catholic faith, there are 15 individuals (or about 0.71% of the population) who belong to the Orthodox Church, and there are 13 individuals (or about 0.62% of the population) who belong to another Christian church. There are 55 (or about 2.61% of the population) who are Islamic. There are 12 individuals (or about 0.57% of the population) who belong to another church (not listed on the census), 82 (or about 3.89% of the population) belong to no church, are agnostic or atheist, and 44 individuals (or about 2.09% of the population) did not answer the question.
The historical population is given in the following table:

Heritage sites of national significance
The Church of the Madonna del Ponte chiuso is listed as a Swiss heritage site of national significance.

Notable residents
 Lorenzo Sciasca (1643–1694), Baroque architect and builder
 Antonio Riva (1650–1713), Baroque architect and builder
 Gabriel de Gabrieli (1671–1747), Baroque architect
 Giovanni Simonetti (1652–1716), Baroque builder and plasterer
 Giulio Simonetti (1659–1729), Baroque architect and builder
 Kaspar Zuccalli (about 1629–1678), Baroque builder
 Enrico Zuccalli (perhaps Johann Heinrich Zuccalli, 1642–1724), Baroque builder
 Giovanni Gaspare Zuccalli (about 1667–1717), Baroque builder

References

External links
 Official website 
 

 
Cultural property of national significance in Graubünden